AlphaSights is an information services company, specializing in connecting clients with experts, sometimes referred to as an expert network. The company's clients include professionals operating in management & strategy consulting, investment management, private equity, corporate and professional services firms with interests in a range of markets including technology, industrials, consumer goods, telecommunications, utilities, financial services, healthcare, consumer services, basic materials, and oil and gas.

AlphaSights is headquartered in London and has offices in New York, Hamburg, Dubai, Hong Kong, San Francisco, Shanghai, Seoul, and Tokyo.

Founders
The company was founded in 2008 and incorporated in 2009 in London by Max Cartellieri and Andrew Heath. They met at Stanford Business School in California, but each founded different companies before founding AlphaSights. Cartellieri co-founded Ciao AG, a leading European price comparison website, backed by Munich-based Venture capital investor Acton Capital Partners and ultimately acquired by Microsoft (MSFT). Andrew Heath co-founded GoIndustry, an online marketplace that trades surplus industrial goods all over Europe, now part of GoIndustry DoveBid.

Growth and expansion
AlphaSights opened its second office in New York City and third office in Hong Kong in 2011 before opening further offices in Dubai in 2013, San Francisco in 2015, Seoul, Hamburg and Shanghai in 2016. In 2013, the company was named the third fastest-growing company headquartered in the UK by The Sunday Times Fast Track 100 and has appeared on the list every year since, placing 11th in 2014, 21st in 2015, 41 in 2016 and 81 in 2017. In April 2017, AlphaSights was named as one of the fastest-growing and most disruptive companies headquartered in Europe by the Financial Times.

References

External links
Official website

Consulting firms established in 2008
Research and analysis firms
Companies based in the City of London
Privately held companies based in London
Business intelligence companies
Knowledge markets
Research and analysis firms of the United Kingdom